Mensura Subregion is a subregion in the Gash Barka region of western Eritrea. The capital lies at Mensura.

References
Awate.com: Martyr Statistics

Gash-Barka Region
Subregions of Eritrea